Vivencias is the sixteenth (16th) studio album by Puerto Rican singer Yolandita Monge. It was released in 1988 and includes the massive hits "Este Amor Que Hay que Callar", "Borinqueña”, “Débil", "Quítame A Ese Hombre Del Corazón", "Por Tí (Call Me)", "Acaríciame", and "Cuando Termina Un Amor".  Nearly all the tracks in this album were huge radio hits that the singer still performs in her live shows. This album earned the first Platinum status for a female Puerto Rican singer. Since then, it has earned double Platinum and double Gold status. The album's cover picture was taken by late photographer and stylist Raúl Torres.

The track "Este Amor Que Hay Que Callar", composed by Canarian singer-songwriter Braulio, caused considerable controversy in Puerto Rico due to its theme of adultery.  At the time, some conservative radio stations refused to play the song deeming the lyrics too explicit.

The dance song "Por Tí (Call Me)" was remixed by DJ Pablo Flores and became a club anthem in Puerto Rico and USA.  Those remixes were released in a best selling Maxi-Single, a first for a female singer of Puerto Rico and Latin America.

Due to the massive sales and constant radio play of this album, Monge also recorded a music video of all the tracks of this release also titled Vivencias, which was available in VHS and is now sold-out and out of print. Three of the songs from this 1989 special music video ("Este Amor Que Hay Que Callar", "Débil", and "Quítame A Ese Hombre Del Corazón") were re-released in 2007 in DVD format in the Demasiado Fuerte album of 2007.

It is impossible to talk about Yolandita Monge without mentioning this recording, perhaps because it is the most successful album of her career and recognized as the one where the singer reached her absolute peak in terms of popularity in Puerto Rico and Latin American markets.  If from 1985 to now, Monge became a figure of first order in the musical landscape of Puerto Rico, with this album she reached "super stardom", appearing relentlessly in all media, newspapers, magazines, radio and television.  This is a strong, passionate, intense album that showcases the unique interpretive power of Yolandita Monge.  Considered by fans and critics alike her best production and her crowning achievement.

This release is her only studio album from her CBS Records years that is exclusively available as a digital download at Amazon.

Track listing

Credits and personnel

Vocals: Yolandita Monge
Producers: Rudy Pérez, Ricardo Eddy
Executive Producer: Angel Carrasco
Arrangements & Musical Direction: Rudy Pérez, Ricardo Eddy
Programming & Keyboards: Ricardo Eddy
Bass: Julio Hernández, Ricardo Eddy
Guitars: Rudy Pérez, Brian Monrroney
Percussion: Rudy Pérez
Strings: Alexander Prilutchi, Jorge Orbón, Bogdan Chruszez, Gerry Miller, Bob Bazzo, Ignacio Berroa, Alfredo Oliva, Bogumila Zgraja, José Montoto, Iris Vaneck, Carol Friedman, Phil Lakofsky
Brass: Tony Concepción, Kenny Faulk, Dana Teboe

Chorus: Geannie Cruz, Rudy Pérez
Engineer: Rudy Pérez, Víctor Di Persia
Mixing: Rudy Pérez, Ricardo Eddy
Recorded: Coral Gables, Florida, May–July 1988
Photography, Art Design and Concept: Raúl Torres (Prinx Artworx)
Hair & Make-up: Raúl Torres

Notes

Track listing and credits from album cover.
Released in Cassette Format on 1988 (DIC-10552).
Released in CD Format on 1988 (CDDI-10552).
Re-released digitally by Orosound Records on October 31, 2013.

Charts

Album

Singles

References

Yolandita Monge albums
1988 albums
Albums produced by Rudy Pérez